"Way Out West" is the debut single by Australian band the Dingoes. It was released in October 1973 and peaked in the top 40 of the Australian Kent Music Report singles chart, reaching number 26 in Melbourne. The song became the band's signature tune.

Lyrics
The song explains the life of mining in Australia, telling the story of a man who has left his job and wife in the city to work for a company drilling for oil and enjoys "living and a working on the land".

Charts

James Blundell and James Reyne version

Australian country artists James Blundell and James Reyne covered the song and released it as a single in 1992. Their version became a hit in Australia the same year, peaking at number two on the ARIA Singles Chart. It was the highest-charting single for both singers. Their version set in the key of G.

At the APRA Music Awards of 1992 the song won Country Song of the Year.

Chart performance
"Way Out West" debuted at number 28 on 29 March 1992. The next week, it entered the top 10, then reached its peak of number two on 26 April, kept off the top spot by "Under the Bridge" by Red Hot Chili Peppers for two weeks. It remained in the top 10 for four more weeks and the top 50 for a further three weeks.

Track listing
CD single
 James Blundell and James Reyne – "Way Out West" (4:03) 
 James Blundell – "She Won't Let You Down" (4:05) 
 James Reyne – "Long Yard Rider"  (2:14)

Credits
 Bass – Brett Goldsmith
 Drums – Davey Porter
 Guitar – Mark Punch, Paul Gildea
 Harmonica – Justin Brady
 Keyboards – Lee Borkman

Charts

Weekly charts

Year-end charts

Certifications

Other versions
Adam Brand and the Outlaws covered the song on the 2016 album Adam Brand and the Outlaws.

References

1973 singles
1973 songs
1992 singles
APRA Award winners
EMI Records singles
James Blundell (singer) songs
James Reyne songs
Mushroom Records singles